Petr Korda was the defending champion, but lost in the first round to Arnaud Boetsch.

Marc Rosset won in the final 6–4, 3–6, 6–1, against Michael Chang.

Seeds

  Stefan Edberg (semifinals)
  Boris Becker (first round)
  Sergi Bruguera (quarterfinals)
  Michael Stich (second round)
  Michael Chang (final)
  Petr Korda (first round)
  Goran Ivanišević (semifinals)
  Alexander Volkov (quarterfinals)

Draw

Finals

Top half

Bottom half

External links
Draw
Qualifying Draw

Singles